Palais Schwarzenberg is a Baroque palace in front of Schwarzenbergplatz, Landstraße, the 3rd district of Vienna, Austria. It is owned by the princely Schwarzenberg family.

Construction started in 1697 under the architect Johann Lucas von Hildebrandt and finished with alterations in 1728 under Johann Bernhard Fischer von Erlach. Construction was supervised by master builder Anton Erhard Martinelli.

The palace was commissioned by the Obersthofmarschall Heinrich Franz Graf von Mansfeld and Prince von Fondi, but he died while the Palace was being built. The unfinished property was finally bought in 1716 by Prince Adam Franz of Schwarzenberg, who had it completed.

In 1751, a riding school and an orangery were added. The richly decorated Marmorgalerie (marble gallery) is one of the largest features in the palace.

Until 2006, parts of it were a five star hotel, and the building has been used for festivities and events. It doubled as James Bond's hotel in the 1987 movie The Living Daylights. It is currently closed for refurbishment.

A Palais Schwarzenberg in Prague also exists near the cathedral on top of the hill.

Neighboring sights
 Schwarzenbergplatz
 Schwarzenbergstraße
 Lothringerstraße
 Am Heumarkt
 Belvedere
 Rennweg, Prinz-Eugen-Straße, Wieden district
 Russisches-Helden-Denkmal (War Memorial of the Red Army)

See also

 List of Baroque residences

References

Schwarzenberg family
Schwarzenberg
1697 establishments in Austria
Buildings and structures in Landstraße
Schwarzenberg
Baroque architecture in Vienna